Ronald W. (Ron) Hovsepian (born 1961) is the chief executive officer of Indigo Agriculture. He was previously the president and chief executive officer of Novell, Inc., and the president, chief executive officer, and director of IntraLinks Inc.

Education and career

Hovsepian received a Bachelor of Science degree from Boston College.

He started his career at IBM Corporation, where he held a number of management and executive positions over a 16-year period including Worldwide General Manager in IBM Marketing and Services for the Distribution Industry segment, managing product development of hardware and software, sales and marketing, and services.

From 2000 to 2003, he worked in venture capital, as a Managing Director with Internet Capital Group.

He joined Novell in 2003 as executive vice president and president, worldwide field operations. From 2005 to 2011, he was the president and chief executive officer of Novell, Inc. Hovsepian led the negotiations that resulted in the controversial Microsoft and Novell deal that was announced in October 2006. In 2010, Novell announced that it had agreed to be acquired by Attachmate. Hovsepian left Novell on April 25, 2011 after the acquisition of Novell by Attachmate.

In early 2012, Hovsepian was appointed president, chief executive officer, and director of Intralinks Inc. Under his leadership Intralinks developed Intralinks VIA, and Intralinks Dealnexus. He led Intralinks during its acquisitions of PE Nexus, MergerID, and docTrackr. He remained at Intralinks through its acquisition by Synchronoss. In April 2017, Hovsepian left Synchronoss. Hovsepian became the CEO of Indigo Agriculture in September 2020.

Board service 
Hovsepian has served as a member of the Board of Directors for ANSYS since 2012, and is currently serving as the lead independent director. Previously, he was non-executive chairman of ANSYS. He has served as a member of the Board of Advisors for Cloud Technology Partners, a professional services firm in the field of cloud initiatives, since August, 2015. He also served as a member of the Board of Directors for ANN Inc. from 1998 – August, 2015. In that time, he also served as the non-executive chairman of the Board of Directors of ANN Inc. from 2005 – 2015.

References 

1960 births
Living people
Novell people
American people of Armenian descent
American computer businesspeople
American technology chief executives
Boston College alumni